This is the complete list of Asian Games medalists in sailing from 1970 to 2018.

Men

Division II
 Open to both genders

Lechner A-390

Mistral

Mistral light

Mistral heavy

Raceboard light

Raceboard heavy

RS:X

Windglider
 Open to both genders

Optimist
 From 1986 to 1994, open to both genders

Laser 4.7
 Open to both genders

Laser
 From 1986 to 1994, open to both genders

Laser Radial
 Open to both genders

OK
 Open to both genders

Super Moth
 Open to both genders

49er

420

470
 In 1986, open to both genders

Enterprise
 Open to both genders

Fireball
 Open to both genders

Flying Dutchman
 Open to both genders

Hobie 16
 Open to both genders

Match racing
 Beneteau First Class 7.5: 2006
 J/80: 2010–2014
 Open to both genders

Women

Lechner A-390

Mistral

RS:One

RS:X

Optimist

Europe

Laser Radial

29er

49er FX

420

470

Mixed

RS:One

References 

List of medalists

External links
 Olympic Council of Asia

Sailing
medalists